Nadine Chandrawinata (Chinese: 曾纳丁) is an Indonesian actress, award-winning film producer, model and beauty pageant titleholder who was crowned as Puteri Indonesia 2005, She is represented Indonesia at the Miss Universe 2006 pageant. She was the second of Puteri Indonesia (Miss Universe Indonesia) to participate in the pageant (preceded by Artika Sari Devi) after a long hiatus in 1996.

Early life
Nadine was born to parents Andy Chandrawinata (Chinese and Javanese) and Elfriede Fortmann (German). She has a twin younger brother named Marcel Chandrawinata and Mischa Chandrawinata, who both also model and actor. Nadine graduated from London School of Public Relations in Jakarta. She is married to an actor Dimas Anggara on July 7, 2018, at a resort in Lombok. Previously, Nadine and Dimas has married in Bhutan in Buddhist tradition on May 5, 2018. The second wedding ceremony will be held in Jakarta on July 15, 2018. She measures 175 cm (5 feet 9 inches) in height and 60 kg (122 lb) in weight.

Career

On 2006, Nadine was cast as the female supporting in Upi Avianto's drama, Reality, Love, and Rock'n Roll(2006),  in which she was to make her film debut and with fellow actor Herjunot Ali, who happens to be Agni Pratistha's ex-boyfriend. She was an F1 ambassador for the 2006 Petronas Malaysian F1 Grand Prix. She is also a commercial star of Kiranti.

On July 19, 2006, Nadine was reported to the police by the Islamic Front Defenders (Front Pembela Islam) for her involvement in the Miss Universe 2006 beauty Pageant. She was accused of breaking the Code of Law 281, edict number 02/U/1984, regarding Cultural and Educational conduct. Indonesian law forbids any kind of involvement in beauty pageants and considers such to be indecency. Nadine was one of several people who were reported for this misdemeanor, and others included Puteri Indonesia 2004 and Miss Universe 2005 Top 15 finalist, Artika Sari Devi and the Miss Indonesia Foundation.

On 2008, Nadine began her journey as an environmental advocate, as a coral reef ambassador for the Ministry of Marine Affairs and Fisheries of The Republic of Indonesia, a role she continues to hold today. She also started her own campaigning group “Seasoldier”, to raise awareness of the country’s plastic pollution in the ocean, as well as other issues such as mangrove deforestation and illegal dolphin capture. Since it started in 2015, Seasoldier has established a presence in 15 locations across Indonesia, including Bali, Lombok, Medan and Bandung. As part of EU Environment Day 2021, European Union collaborates with Nadine to commemorate World Environment Day.

On July 14, 2011, Nadine Chandrawinata was promoted as Keke Bainena Mamuju (Miss Mamuju) for promoting Mamuju Regency Tourism Industry. She was chosen because of her integrity, and the fact that there were no negative issues during her run as Puteri Indonesia. In July 2017, Nadine Chandrawinata was named as the "Tourism Advocate for New Zealand Tourism" by New Zealand Minister of Tourism to promote New Zealand eco-tourism.

Filmography
Chandrawinata has acted on several television and film, she is also producing some award-winning film.

Film

TV Films

Awards and nomination

References

External links
 

 Official Puteri Indonesia Official Website
 Close up interview at Miss Universe official website
 
 Nadine Chandrawinata - Puteri Indonesia 2005

Indo people
Indonesian Roman Catholics
Indonesian female models
Indonesian film producers
Indonesian film actresses
Indonesian people of Chinese descent
Indonesian people of German descent
Actresses from Jakarta
Javanese people
Living people
Miss Universe 2006 contestants
Puteri Indonesia winners
Year of birth missing (living people)